China and Indonesia established formal diplomatic relations in 1950, more commonly referred to as Sino-Indonesian relations. Prior to this, for many centuries, the two countries maintained a variety of relations mainly in informal trade. Under Sukarno’s presidency, from 1945 to 1967, relations with China deepened,  as in the early 1960s Sukarno embarked on a series of aggressive foreign policies under the rubric of anti-imperialism and personally championed the Non-Aligned Movement. These developments led to increasing friction with the West and closer relations both with China and the USSR.

Sukarno's Guided Democracy relied on two conflicting support pillars, the military and the communists. He favoured the Communist Party of Indonesia (Indonesian: Partai Komunis Indonesia, or PKI), which grew to be the largest political party with 3 million members and in August 1965, Sukarno declared his intention to commit Indonesia to an anti-imperialist alliance with China and other communist regimes and warned the Army not to interfere.
The military, nationalists, and the Islamic groups objected to the prominence of the PKI, fearing the imminent establishment of a communist state in Indonesia and regarded Sukarno's close alliance with communist China as compromising Indonesia's sovereignty. This culminated in the progressive sidelining and eventual ousting of Sukarno from 1965 till 1967 by Suharto and his supporters, who instigated a prolonged persecution and eventual elimination of the PKI with estimates of killings varying from 500,000 to 1 million.
In 1967, Suharto introduced orders banning Chinese literature, culture and characters, encouraging the abandonment of Chinese names and suspended diplomatic relationships with China, to be restored only in 1990.

Indonesian public opinion of China's influence has been evolving. According to a 2014 BBC World Service Poll, was largely positive, with 52% expressing a mainly positive view compared to 28% expressing a mainly negative view. A Pew Research Center poll in 2019 indicated favourability had dropped since then, with 36% of Indonesians expressing a favourable view of China and 36% expressing an unfavourable view.
More recently, in December 2021, in  a survey from Australian think tank the Lowy Institute, Indonesians are becoming increasingly wary of China and Chinese investments, with six in 10 agreeing that Jakarta should join with other nations to limit Beijing's rise.
Only 43% of Indonesians polled said they felt China’s growth was good for Indonesia – down from 54% in 2011. Almost half the 3,000 respondents aged 17–65 said they believed China's aim was to dominate the region.
An important factor in relations is the small, only 3% of the population, but long-established and economically influential Chinese diaspora. This group has been keen to take advantage of trading opportunities with China, which has become Indonesia's biggest trading partner since the signing of the Indonesia-China Strategic Partnership in 2005. Trade flows increased steadily, turning in 2008 into a rising trade deficit for Indonesia. Two-way investment was boosted by President Joko Widodo and CCP general secretary Xi Jinping’s close personal relationship, leading to a surge in investment under China's Belt and Road Initiative (BRI). Inbound investment from China, including Hong Kong, in 2019–2020, ranked second after Singapore 
Both countries are among the largest nations in Asia in terms of both area and population. China is the most populous nation in the world, while Indonesia has the 4th largest population.

Both nations are members of the APEC and the G20.

China has an embassy in Jakarta and consulates in Surabaya and Medan, while Indonesia has an embassy in Beijing and consulates in Guangzhou, Shanghai, and Hong Kong.

A summary of China-Indonesian relations voiced by Mercator Institute for China Studies identified 4 distinct phases: from close allies (1950s-1965) to enemies (1966-1990), to distant associates (1990-2014), to their current close partnership.

History

The relations between imperial China and ancient Indonesia commenced during the 7th century, possibly earlier. Indonesia was part of the maritime Silk Road connecting China with India and the Arab world. Numerous Chinese ceramics were discovered throughout Indonesia, suggesting ancient trade links between both countries. The National Museum of Indonesia has one of the best and the most complete collections of Chinese ceramics discovered outside of China, dated from the Han, Tang, Song, Yuan, Ming and Qing dynasties, spanning for almost two millennia. This particular collection provides a good insight into Indonesia's maritime trade over the centuries. Research indicates that the Chinese sailed to India via Indonesia as early as Western Han period (205 BC to 220 AD) as a part of the maritime silk road and firm trade relations were subsequently established. Traditionally, the Indonesian archipelago, identified by ancient Chinese geographer as Nanyang, was the source of spices such as cloves, cubeb, and nutmeg, raw materials such as sandalwood, gold and tin, as well as exotic rare items such as ivory, rhino horn, tiger fur and bone, exotic birds and colorful feathers. While the fine silk and ceramics of China was sought by ancient Indonesian kingdoms. Indonesia also played some role in the expansion of Buddhism from India to China. A Chinese monk, I-Tsing, visited Srivijaya in 671 for 6 months during his mission to acquire sacred Buddhist texts from India. Other Chinese accounts and chronicles also mention several ancient states in Indonesia today. Chinese records mentioned about Kunlun sailors, presumably Cham or Malays sailors, that sailed and traded many products across ports in Southeast and South Asia. The Malay sailors are most probably hailed from Srivijayan empire in Sumatra. Ancient Indonesian sailors seem to actively sought trade around Southeast Asia and as far as China and India. Since I-Tsing, numbers of Chinese travelers such as Chou Ju-kua began to visit and wrote about the Indonesian archipelago.

Most ancient Chinese-Indonesia relations were trade-motivated and throughout their shared history, most were harmonious and peaceful, with one exception. In 1293, Kublai Khan of Yuan dynasty sent a massive expedition of 1,000 ships to Java to punish the defiant king Kertanegara of Singhasari.  The naval expedition, however, was a failure as Java rose to be Majapahit empire instead. Maritime empires such as Srivijaya, Majapahit, and later Malacca sought trade permits to establish relations with lucrative Chinese markets. The numbers of Chinese immigrants and Chinese influences in the archipelago reached a new height, with the massive Ming dynasty naval expedition led by admiral Zheng He that visited Java, Sumatra, and the Malay peninsula in early the 15th century. Zheng He's translator Ma Huan wrote a detailed description of Majapahit and where the king of Java lived. The report was composed and collected in Yingya Shenglan, which provides a valuable insight on the culture, customs, also various social and economic aspects of Chao-Wa (Java) during Majapahit period. The Chinese naval expedition contributed to the establishment of overseas Chinese settlements in Indonesia, such as Semarang, Tuban and Rembang which have had significant Chinese populations since Majapahit era.

During the colonial Dutch East Indies Company and Dutch East Indies era, significant Chinese settlers began to fill labor needs and seek a new life in the Indonesian archipelago. Most of Chinese Indonesian immigrants came from the provinces of Southern China, such as Fujian and Guangdong. Significant Chinese settlements were established in West Kalimantan, the east coast of Sumatra, and the northern coast of Java.

After the Indonesia's independence in 1945 and the acknowledgement of its sovereignty from the Dutch in 1949, Indonesia established political relations with China (previously with Republic of China and later with People's Republic of China) in 1950. Indeed, it was the first country in Southeast Asia to establish official diplomatic relations with the PRC. During the  Sukarno administration, China and Indonesia enjoyed close relations. In the 1950s to 1960s the Chinese Communist Party had close relations with their Indonesian counterparts. Sukarno supported and won the bid for the 1962 Asian Games held in Jakarta. There was political tension when the Indonesians refused the entry of delegations from Taiwan. After the International Olympic Committee imposed sanctions on Indonesia due to this exclusion policy, Sukarno retaliated by organising a "non-imperialist" competitor event to the Olympic Games, called the Games of New Emerging Forces (GANEFO).
Sukarno responded that the IOC was itself political because it did not have the People's Republic of China as members; the IOC was simply "a tool of the imperialists and colonialists." Sukarno formed a new alliance with China, North Korea, North Vietnam, and Cambodia which he called the "Beijing-Pyongyang-Hanoi-Phnom Penh-Jakarta Axis". After withdrawing Indonesia from the "imperialist-dominated" United Nations in January 1965, Sukarno sought to establish a competitor organisation to the UN called the Conference of New Emerging Forces (CONEFO) with support from the People's Republic of China, who at that time was not yet a member of United Nations. With the government heavily indebted to the Soviet Union, Indonesia became increasingly dependent on China for support. Sukarno spoke increasingly of a Beijing-Jakarta axis,

However, after the failed communist coup in 1965 resulting in the fall of Sukarno and the rise of Suharto in 1967, Indonesia severed the diplomatic relations, maintaining that Communist China was partly responsible behind the coup. The diplomatic relations however, were restored and resumed in 1990 resulting in the normalization of China-Indonesia diplomatic relations.

Political relations history

China and Indonesia established diplomatic relations on April 13, 1950, which were suspended on October 30, 1967, due to the occurrence of the September 30 event of 1965, the subsequent 1967 seizure of power by Lt. General Suharto which appointed him to the office of acting president, the stepping down of President Sukarno, and the eventual beginning of the capitalist 'New Order', which, under Suharto's presidency, would last thirty-one years.

Bilateral relations have improved since the 1980s. Foreign Minister Qian Qichen of China met with President Suharto and State Minister Moerdiono of Indonesia in 1989 to discuss the resumption of diplomatic relations of the two countries. In December 1989, the two sides held talks on the technical issues regarding the normalization of bilateral relations and signed the Minutes. Foreign Minister Ali Alatas of Indonesia visited China on invitation in July 1990 and the two sides issued the Agreement on the Settlement of Indonesia's Debt Obligation to China and the Communique on the Resumption of Diplomatic Relations between the two countries. The two countries issued the "Communiqué on the Restoration of Diplomatic Relations between the Two Countries".

Premier Li Peng visited Indonesia on invitation on August 6, 1990. In his talks with President Soeharto, the two sides expressed their willingness to improve relations between the two countries on the basis of the Five Principles of Peaceful Co-Existence and the Ten Principles of the Bandung Conference. On 8 August, Foreign Ministers of China and Indonesia on behalf of their respective governments, signed the Memorandum of Understanding on the Resumption of Diplomatic Relations. The two sides declared the formal resumption of the diplomatic relations between China and Indonesia that day.

China's cautious response to the 1998 anti-Chinese riots caused an uproar among human rights groups. Following protests at the Indonesian embassy in Beijing in August, Foreign Minister Tang Jiaxuan made a direct appeal to the Indonesian government to ensure the protection of Chinese Indonesian communities.

In September 2017, two giant pandas, Cai Tao and Hu Chun, arrived in Jakarta from Sichuan province to be placed in Taman Safari in Bogor as part of the 60th anniversary celebrations of China–Indonesia bilateral relations.

In December 2018, the issue of China's Xinjiang re-education prisons based on the persecution of Islamic citizens and human rights abuses against the Uyghur Muslim minority was brought up in parliament. Indonesian Vice President Jusuf Kalla said: "we don't want to intervene in the domestic affairs of another country."

Trade and investment

Trade between China and Indonesia is on the rise, especially after the implementation of ACFTA since early 2010. Indeed, while in 2003 trade between Indonesia and China reached only US$3.8 billion, in 2010 it multiplied almost 10 times and reached US$36.1 billion. China's transformation into Fastest growing country in the 21st century has led to an increase of foreign investments in the bamboo network, a network of overseas Chinese businesses operating in the markets of Southeast Asia that share common family and cultural ties. However the free trade with China has caused much anxiety in Indonesia, since inflows of cheap products from China could harm Indonesian industry. Indonesian private sector and civil society organizations vigorously lobbied the Indonesian government and members of parliament, insisting that Indonesia should either pull out of the agreement or renegotiate its terms with Beijing.

China has remained on top of Indonesia's key major trading partners, serving as the country's largest export and import market. China serves as Indonesia's largest export destination after overtaking Japan and United States, reaching US$16.8 billion. China is also Indonesia's most important source of imports, reaching US$30.8 billion, or 22.7% of Indonesian imports in 2016. The balance however was in favour of China as Indonesia booked a trade deficit of US$14 billion in 2016.

From China's perspective, since 2010 ASEAN as a whole has become its fourth-largest trading partner after the European Union, Japan and the United States. Among ASEAN member countries, Indonesia was China's fourth-largest trading partner, which, according to data as of May 2010 from the Ministry of Commerce of the People's Republic of China, amounted to US$12.4 billion, after Malaysia (US$22.2 billion), Singapore (US$17.9 billion) and Thailand (US$15.7 billion).

Being the second-largest donor of foreign aid to Indonesia after Singapore, China has also financed and developed multiple infrastructure projects in the country to create more growth in its economy, particularly in the utility, transportation, industry and tourism, with surging inflows of aid in recent years.

On late September 2015, Indonesia awarded a multibillion-dollar Jakarta-Bandung high-speed railway project to China. It was said that China's offer to build the Jakarta-Bandung line without requiring loan guarantee nor funding from Indonesia was the tipping point of Jakarta's decision. The Jakarta-Bandung high-speed rail is planned to begin its operations to public in 2019.

In late 2021, the president of Indonesia Jokowi Widodo broke ground on a $132 billion U.S. "green" industrial estate to be constructed on Borneo with investments from China and the United Arab Emirates and electrified by a hydropower plant funded by China.

Culture

Since ancient times, Indonesian culture began to absorb many aspects of Chinese elements, such as Chinese origin loanwords in Indonesian that mostly are terms of all things Chinese, cuisine, to art and crafts such as Javanese Batik Pesisiran (coastal batik) that demonstrate Chinese images such as Chinese cloud, phoenix, dragon, qilin, to peony flower. Chinese settlers began to settle in Indonesian coastal cities as early as Srivijaya (c. 7th century) and Majapahit (c. 14th century) period. And later accelerated during Dutch East Indies Company era (c. 17th century). These Chinese immigrants brought with them Chinese culture of their homeland, intermarried with local women and created the hybrid peranakan culture, still observable today in some of Indonesian cities and neighboring Malaysia and Singapore. Today, there are around 2,832,510 Chinese Indonesians according to 2010 census, which formed 1.20% of the Indonesian population.

State visits

The bilateral relations developed gradually since the resumption of diplomatic relations of the two countries. Since the resumption of diplomatic ties between the two countries, President Yang Shangkun (in 1991), Chairman of NPC Standing Committee Qiao Shi (in 1993) and Vice Premier Zhu Rongji (in 1996), Vice President Hu Jintao (in 2000) of China visited Indonesia. President Suharto (in 1990), Speaker of Parliament Suhud (in 1991), Vice President Sudharmono (in 1992) and Chairman of the Supreme Advisory Council Sudomo (in 1997) visited China. Chinese leader Jiang Zemin paid a state visit to Indonesia in November 1994 after he attended the second APEC Leaders' Informal Meeting. In December 1999, President K.H. Abdurrahman Wahid of Indonesia paid a state visit to China, during which the two countries issued a joint press communiqué. In July 2000, Vice President Hu Jintao visited Indonesia at the invitation of Vice President Megawati.

In November 2001, Premier Zhu Rongji paid a visit to Indonesia. In March 2002, Indonesian President Megawati Sukarnoputri paid a state visit to China. In April, President Abdurrahman Wahid of the Indonesian People's Consultative Assembly visited China. In September, Chairman Li Peng of the NPC paid an official friendly visit to Indonesia.

Starting from 1991, the foreign ministries of the two countries set up a consultation mechanism and up to now it has held six times of consultation. In March 2002, the two countries exchanged notes in regard with the setup of Indonesian consulates general in Guangzhou. Indonesia has its Consulate-General in Hong Kong.

On November 8 to 11, 2014, newly elected Indonesian President Joko Widodo paid his first official overseas visit to China to attend APEC summit in Beijing. He paid bilateral meeting with Chinese leader & CCP general secretary Xi Jinping and Chinese premier Li Keqiang. Most recently in April 2015, Chinese leader Xi Jinping visited Bandung to commemorate the 60th anniversary of the Asian-African Conference and Joko Widodo visited Beijing to attend the Belt and Road Forum on May 14–15, 2017.

Tiongkok 
Tiongkok is the Indonesian term for China, originating from the Min Nan (the local dialect of Southern Fujian) version of the word Zhongguo which is the term used to refer to China in Mandarin. The word—in its Romanized form (Tiongkok)-- was used in Indonesian by the Indonesian government to refer to China up until 1972 but its use ceased following a period of hostile relations in the 1960s. The authoritarian, anti-Chinese New Order government mandated the replacement of the term Tiongkok, as well as Tionghoa, with "Cina". Many Chinese Indonesians felt that the term (in reference to them) was derogatory and racist, connoting "backwardness, humiliation, queues and bound feet". After the fall of President Suharto in 1998, the use of Tiongkok has seen a re-emergence.

On 14 March 2014, Indonesian President, Susilo Bambang Yudhoyono, signed a presidential decree (Keputusan Presiden) No. 12/2014, to change the legal use of Indonesian language term to refer China. Changes including to replace the term Cina or China to Tiongkok to refer China as a country, and Tionghoa to refer Chinese people, or Chinese descents. This change was meant to eradicate discrimination and prejudice towards Chinese Indonesians.

South China Sea disputes 

Despite Indonesia's position as a non-claimant state in the South China Sea dispute, two countries were inevitably involved in this territorial dispute; as parts of China's unilaterally claimed nine-dash line is intersecting with Indonesia's exclusive economic zone near Natuna islands. Although China has acknowledged Indonesia's sovereignty over Natuna islands, China argues that the waters around Natuna islands are Chinese "traditional fishing grounds". Indonesia quickly  dismiss this claim and believes it has no legal basis.

In March 2016, the two countries were involved in confrontation near Natuna Islands as Indonesian maritime authority that tried to capture a Chinese trawler accused for illegal fishing was prevented by Chinese coast guard. Indonesia insists to prosecute Chinese trawler crew, despite Beijing's demand to release them. An Indonesian official said that the "traditional fishing grounds" was not recognised under the UNCLOS. This incident prompted Indonesian military to increase its presence in Natuna area. On 23 June 2016, Indonesian President Joko Widodo visited Natuna islands on a warship, this was meant to send a "clear message" that Indonesia was "very serious in its effort to protect its sovereignty".

Following the Permanent Court of Arbitration ruling on 12 July 2016, Indonesia called on all parties involved in the territorial dispute to exercise self-restraint and to respect applicable international laws.

In January 2020, Chinese fishing boats, escorted by Chinese coast guard vessels, once again conducted fishing off the coast of northern islands of Natuna in waters claimed by Indonesia as its exclusive economic zone (EEZ). This led to a stand-off between the countries and  Indonesia's decision to send its fishermen to join warships in the area to help defend against Chinese vessels. Indonesia had deployed two Kapitan Pattimura-class anti-submarine corvettes at Great Natuna Island in early January, and later added one Martadinata-class guided-missile frigate, two Bung Tomo-class corvettes, one Ahmed Yani-class frigate, one Makassar-class landing platform dock (LPD), one Cakra-class diesel submarine and four F-16C/D fighter jets to the deployment even when China vessels appeared to have backed down from the region.

In December 2021, Chinese coast guard vessels were deployed to halt Indonesian oil exploration in the SCS.

See also 
 Chinese Indonesian (Tionghoa)
 Chinese Indonesian surname
 Legislation on Chinese Indonesians
 Foreign relations of the People's Republic of China
 Foreign relations of Indonesia
 Bamboo network
 Anti-Chinese sentiment in Indonesia

References

Bibliography 

 

 Zhou, Taomo. (2013), "Ambivalent Alliance: Chinese Policy towards Indonesia, 1960-1965," Cold War International History Project Working Paper No. 67.
 Zhou, Taomo. (2019) Migration in the Time of Revolution: China, Indonesia, and the Cold War (Cornell University Press, 2019) Online review

External links 

 Embassy of People's Republic of China in Republic of Indonesia
 Embassy of the Republic of Indonesia in People's Republic of China
 Communiqué of the government of the People's Republic of China and the Government of the Republic of Indonesia on the resumption of diplomatic relations between the two countries
 Joint Press Communiqué of The People's Republic of China and the Republic of Indonesia
 History of China-Indonesian relations

 
Indonesia
China, Peoples Republic